Mohsin Khan (born 15 July 1998) is an Indian cricketer. He made his Twenty20 debut for Uttar Pradesh in the 2017–18 Zonal T20 League on 10 January 2018. In January 2018, he was bought by the Mumbai Indians in the 2018 IPL auction. He made his List A debut for Uttar Pradesh in the 2017–18 Vijay Hazare Trophy on 7 February 2018. In the 2020 IPL auction, he was bought by the Mumbai Indians ahead of the 2020 Indian Premier League. He made his first-class debut on 27 January 2020, for Uttar Pradesh in the 2019–20 Ranji Trophy.

In February 2022, he was bought by the Lucknow Super Giants in the auction for the 2022 Indian Premier League

References

External links
 

1998 births
Living people
Indian cricketers
Uttar Pradesh cricketers
Cricketers from Uttar Pradesh
Lucknow Super Giants cricketers